William Fletcher was a rugby union international who represented England from 1873 to 1875.

Early life
William Fletcher was born on 10 December 1851 in Kensington. He attended Marlborough College and went on to study at the University of Oxford.

Rugby union career
At Oxford, Fletcher won four blues (1872, 1873 (2), 1874) and played in the first varsity match against Cambridge University in 1872. Fletcher made his international debut on 3 March 1873 at Hamilton Crescent, Glasgow in the Scotland vs England match. He played his final match for England on 8 March 1875 at Edinburgh in the Scotland vs England match.

Career
Fletcher became a merchant in London.

References

1851 births
1895 deaths
English rugby union players
England international rugby union players
Rugby union forwards
Rugby union players from Kensington